Bend of the River is a 1952 American Western film directed by Anthony Mann and starring James Stewart, Arthur Kennedy, Julie Adams, and Rock Hudson. Based on the 1950 novel Bend of the Snake by Bill Gulick, the film is about a tough cowboy who risks his life to deliver confiscated supplies to homesteaders after gold is discovered in the region. Bend of the River was filmed on location in Sandy River, Mount Hood, the Columbia River and Timberline, Oregon. This is the second Western film collaboration between Anthony Mann and James Stewart.

Plot
In 1866, remorseful former border raider Glyn McLyntock is scouting for a wagon train of settlers to Oregon. While he is checking the trail ahead, he rescues Emerson Cole from being lynched for stealing a horse. Cole, who says the horse is "not exactly stolen", thinks he has heard of McLyntock, but does not pursue the subject. One of the pioneers in the wagon train is the eligible Laura Baile. That night, they are attacked by five Shoshone Indians and Laura is wounded by an arrow. McLyntock and Cole go out to deal with the Shoshones and Cole saves McLyntock's life in the process. McLyntock welcomes Cole, but Jeremy Baile, the leader of the settlers, does not trust Cole and does not believe that a man can change from bad to good.

When they reach Portland, Oregon, Laura remains there to recover. Cole also leaves the party saying that he wants to go to California to find gold. The rest, including McLyntock, go on to establish a settlement in the wilderness after making arrangements with a man named Tom Hendricks for the supplies they need for the winter to be sent on later ("the first week in September"). That night, they have a big party and meet a professional gambler named Trey Wilson.

With winter fast approaching and the supplies at least six weeks late, they begin to worry when the food runs low. McLyntock and Jeremy go back to Portland to investigate. They find that a gold rush has inflated prices enormously. Laura and Cole are working for Hendricks and have no intention of going to the settlement. Jeremy is not happy about his daughter being Cole's girl. Meanwhile, Hendricks has decided to sell their supplies for a much higher price to a mining camp. McLyntock secretly hires some men to load the supplies to take back to the settlement, but Hendricks finds out, instigating a shootout. Cole and Trey both side with McLyntock. When they are pursued, McLyntock sets up an ambush. Hendricks and some of his gang are killed, and the rest are driven off.

On the way to the settlement, some of the miners show up and offer an exorbitant sum for the supplies. The hired men begin thinking about commandeering the wagon train. Cole cannot resist the temptation of all that money and double-crosses his friend, but does not kill him. That proves to be a fatal mistake. McLyntock tracks them down and retakes the supplies with the assistance of Jeremy, Laura, and Trey. Cole brings some miners, but they are beaten off in a climactic gunfight at a river. McLyntock fights and kills Cole, and the current takes his body away. At the end, they reach the settlement with the supplies and it is apparent that Laura and McLyntock are now a couple.

Cast

 James Stewart as Glyn McLyntock
 Arthur Kennedy as Emerson Cole
 Julie Adams as Laura Baile
 Rock Hudson as Trey Wilson, a professional gambler
 Lori Nelson as Marjie Baile
 Jay C. Flippen as Jeremy Baile
 Howard Petrie as Tom Hendricks
 Chubby Johnson as Captain Mello
 Stepin Fetchit as Adam, Mello's assistant
 Harry Morgan as Shorty, one of the treacherous hired men
 Jack Lambert as Red, another hired hand
 Royal Dano as Long Tom, a third untrustworthy hire-on
 Frances Bavier as Mrs. Prentiss
 Frank Ferguson as Tom Grundy

Production
James Stewart, best known for his down-to-earth persona, established another persona along with director Anthony Mann with the 1950 Western film Winchester '73. This new Stewart persona was more violent, edgier and more disillusioned, but a persona that was still likable. This collaboration included eight films, five of them Westerns. Along with Winchester '73 and Bend of the River, these included The Naked Spur (1953), The Far Country (1954) and The Man From Laramie (1955). This was the second of the Western collaborations between them.

The film was written by Borden Chase, who had co-written Winchester '73 and would write The Far Country. It was based on the 1950 novel Bend of the Snake, by Bill Gulick.

In Great Britain in the 1950s, the movie was known under the title Where the River Bends. Under this name the film was given a multi-page review section in F. Maurice Speed's The Western Film Annual for the 1952 edition of his book.

Character actor Arthur Kennedy was cast as Emerson Cole. Kennedy was confined to shooting riding scenes until his knee healed, after spraining it while filming the fight scene with Jay C. Flippen, who plays Jeremy Baile, the leader of the Baile family. Julie Adams was cast as Laura while Lori Nelson was cast as her sister Marjie. Adams is best known for her role as Kay Lawrence in the 1954 horror film Creature from the Black Lagoon and Nelson played the female lead role in the 1955 sequel Revenge of the Creature, which were both directed by Jack Arnold. Rock Hudson played Trey Wilson, a professional gambler.

The film was filmed in Mount Hood, Sandy River and Timberline, Oregon.

To promote the film before it was released, a  steamboat race on the Columbia River was staged on January 24, 1952, featuring the sternwheeler Henderson (which had been used in the film, and which had several of the stars on board) versus the newer sternwheeler Portland. The Henderson won the race.

Reception
The film first released on February 13, 1952. It grossed about $3 million ($ in modern dollars). When first released, the film received poor reviews, but has since then gained more critical acclaim and is recognized as a great Western.

The New York Times, in its 1952 review said the film "keeps you guessing as to which of its male stars is going to turn out 'good' and which 'bad' and of the cast, the paper's reviewer commented "So it comes down to farmers and miners and Mr. Stewart versus Mr. Kennedy. Both actors are first-rate performers when it comes to slinging guns and giving a general impression of cryptic personalities. Jay C. Flippen is good as the top farmer, Julia Adams and Lori Nelson make svelte farm girls and Rock Hudson is ornamental as a gentleman gambler who strings along. We are sorry to note that Stepin Fetchit is back to play a clownish stereotype, but the scenery is good in Technicolor and the fightin' is frequent and bold."

Stewart took a percentage of the profits, the second film on which he had done so, after 1950's Winchester '73, also a Western directed by Mann. In 1953, William Goetz estimated that Stewart had earned $750,000 ($ in modern dollars) from the film.

The movie holds a perfect 100% rating on Rotten Tomatoes.

In 2008, Bend of the River was nominated for AFI's Top 10 Western Films list.

References

External links 
 
 
 
 

1952 films
1952 Western (genre) films
American Western (genre) films
Films directed by Anthony Mann
Films shot in Oregon
Films set in Oregon
Universal Pictures films
Films set in 1866
Films based on American novels
Films scored by Hans J. Salter
Revisionist Western (genre) films
1950s English-language films
1950s American films